Midnight DJ is a Filipino reality drama-horror-action-thriller television series about DJ who works at night and at the same time, together with his team, they work to find solutions to the paranormal problems of his listeners. The series debuted in 2008 on TV5 with the original Midnight DJ played by Paolo Contis (Season 1), Oyo Boy replaced him after Paolo's character died on the last episode of Season 1. The show ended on Season 11 in a different format than the previous seasons. It airs every Saturday night after Talentadong Pinoy and re-run airing from TV5, It airs every Thursday night at 9:00 PM premieres on March 20, 2020 and moved to 8:30 PM premieres on November 11, 2021 on PHTV UHF Channel 23 in Metro Manila.

Series overview

Midnight DJ is the name of a hit radio program that airs on LXFM or New City Radio. The show was originally hosted by Patrick (Paolo Contis). Six months after the original host's death, Samboy (Oyo Boy Sotto) takes over the position of Midnight DJ.

Joining Samboy are Andrea, the radio station's programming director; Trixie, the owner and station manager of LXFM; Samantha, the sweet yet spunky researcher; and Bodjie, the team's cowardly radio technician.

After one season, when Samantha leaves for the States, she is replaced by Samboy's childhood friend, Chicklet.

Together, the team forges on to bridge the living and the dead, taking on unresolved deaths, ghosts and ghouls as they bring life to the stories that haunt the night.

Midnight DJ in its original format was directed by Lore Reyes for 10 seasons. In March 2011, Director Reyes bid farewell to the show after completing the last episode of Season 10, and is now back with his home network GMA-7.

The last season was known as Midnight DJ: Mga Tunay na Kwento ng Lagim (English: Midnight DJ: The True Story of Terror). The stories are based on real stories of horror in many parts of the Philippines.

Cast 

 Oyo Boy Sotto portrays Samboy - The current host of Midnight DJ. A street-smart lovable everyman with a shady past and a knack for native folklore. Though lacking the ability to communicate with spirits, Samboy auditioned for the position of Midnight DJ. After solving the orphanage haunting, he gets picked for the position after tricking everyone into believing that he was able to solve the case using his third eye. In Parola, his trickery was discovered by Samgirl and he eventually confesses to her. At the end of the 2nd season, he confesses to Andrea and the crew that he has no ability to communicate with ghosts in fear of the crew's end.
 Desiree del Valle portrays Andrea - LXFM's programming director. She originally worked as producer of Midnight DJ and was promoted to her current position in Season 2. At the start of the second season, she calls for auditions to find the new Midnight DJ. She picks Samboy over Andy and Shugo (Paolo Paraiso) after Samboy solves the orphanage haunting and believing that Samboy was able to solve the case using his third eye.
 Jenny Miller portrays Trixie - The owner and station manager of LXFM or New City Radio. Trixie revives the show, to recover the radio station's dwindling ratings, six months after the death of Patrick, the original host of Midnight DJ. She once left for the United States but had constant communication with Andrea. (Miller temporarily left the show to get married, but returned after a few months.)
 Joaqui Tupas portrays Bodjie - The radio program's cowardly resident radio technician. Bodjie also functions as the show's cameraman and driver.
 Meg Imperial portrays QT - The program's researcher as well as the resident psychic. QT's psychic powers first manifested in the episode Gayuma ng Panget during the absence of Max, the crew's former psychic. Her powers never manifested again during Sam's tenure with the team. She replaced Max when Sam Pinto left the show.
 John Medina portrays Arthur - The police chief and Andrea's boyfriend.
 Kristine Hermosa portrays Berna - The best friend and first love of Samboy. The last time she appeared was in the episode Wedding Monster.

Dismissals 
 Paolo Contis portrays Patrick - The original Midnight DJ, who has an open third eye and is able to communicate with the spirits. He was killed off the show at the end of the first season. (Before the end of Season 1, Contis signed an exclusive contract with GMA Network. He was given an extension to finish the first season of the show but was not allowed to appear in the second season.)
 Bangs Garcia portrays Samantha "Samgirl" - The team's researcher. She also has an open third eye. She joined the team at the start of the second season. She was the first to discover that the current Midnight DJ, Samboy, has no ability to see spirits. After one season, Samgirl leaves for the United States. (Garcia left the show because of her commitment in ABS-CBN's Magkano ang Iyong Dangal?.)
 Baron Geisler portrays Andy - A guy who can communicate with spirits. He first appeared in the first episode of the second season. He auditioned for the position of Midnight DJ along with Samboy and Shugo. He wasn't picked for the position, but he makes again an appearance in Halimaw sa Bayong when Andrea was planning to pick someone to replace Samboy as Midnight DJ. (Geisler and Del Valle were originally considered to replace Contis as the radio jock in the show. Eventually, the role went to Sotto.)
 Erich Gonzales portrays Chicklet - A close friend of Samboy. Like Samantha, she also has the ability to feel the presence of spirits. She first appeared in Killer Kubeta where she temporarily replaces Samgirl, who was absent at that time. She joins the team at the beginning of the third season replacing Samgirl, who left for the United States at the end of the second season. In Highschool Sapi and Pabrika ng Multo, it was revealed that she has known Samboy since they were kids. She lived in the same orphanage as Samboy. In the episode Killer Teddy Bear, she went to the states to look after her father. (Gonzales left the show because of her commitment to ABS-CBN's Katorse.)
Sophia Ysm portrays Swit - She first appeared on the episode of Bata, Langit, Impyerno along with the three black angels fighting the white demon Lucera. During the Halimaw sa Tuod episode, it was discovered that she can help Kimchi to strengthen her psychic ability.
 Sam Pinto portrays Max - The team's resident psychic. She first appeared in the Season 4 episode, Oink! Oink!. (Pinto left the show due to joining Pinoy Big Brother: Double Up.)
Don Umali portrays Chief Apollo - The MDJ team's partner police chief and brother of Chief Arturo/Arthur (played by John Medina). It was not clear if Chief Apollo and Andrea had a relationship but there are episodes wherein you may notice that the team usually tease them with each other (Ex. Payong na Pumapatay episode).
 Lucia Cristobal portrays Kimberly "Kimchi" Chi - A nurse and previous client of the Midnight DJ team. After the events of the Zombie Massacre, Andrea hired her so that she could use Kimchi's medical point of view. In the episode Bintilador na Matador, she accidentally absorbs QT's psychic powers. She took over QT's position in the team as psychic. She died because she protected Samboy from the control of the soul of Lucera in Kimchi's body. She was going to kill Samboy but she controlled herself and faced the ax at herself, Lucera controlled again and the ax hit her.
 Lauren Young portrays Jessie - A blogger and columnist who is writing about the paranormal. Samboy accused her of stealing their cases, saying that Jessie's blog is a copy of the radio show. (Young left the show for Juanita Banana.)
 Xian Lim portrays Jake - Like QT, he has a third eye. He first appeared in Kalye Kamatayan and helped the team get Samboy back from the world of the dead. He used a different technique to help them.

Slogan 
 Lumingon ka, di ka nag-iisa! (2008–2009; 2011)

Awards 
Winner, Best Horror/Fantasy Show - 2009 PMPC Star Awards for TV
Nominated, Best Horror/Fantasy Show - 2008 PMPC Star Awards for TV

References

External links 
Midnight DJ on TV5
Midnight DJ on Bigtop Media Productions

Midnight DJ Multiply Site

TV5 (Philippine TV network) original programming
2008 Philippine television series debuts
2011 Philippine television series endings
Philippine drama television series
Philippine horror fiction television series
Filipino-language television shows